Sunnydale is the fictional setting for the TV series Buffy the Vampire Slayer .

Sunnydale may also refer to:

Places
Sunnydale, Kansas, U.S.
Sunnydale, Washington, U.S.
Sunnydale Projects, Visitacion Valley, San Francisco, California, U.S.
Sunnydale station

Other uses
 Sunnydale (Tryon, North Carolina), U.S., a historic building

See also
 Sunnidale (disambiguation)
 Sunnyvale (disambiguation)
 Sunningdale, a village in Berkshire, England